The Jaisalmer Wind Park is India's second largest and globally the fourth-largest operational onshore wind farm. This project is located in Jaisalmer district, Rajasthan, Western India.

History 
The project was initiated in August 2001 by developed by Suzlon Energy and comprises Suzlon's entire wind portfolio – ranging from the earliest 350 kW model to the latest S9X – 2.1 MW series.  Its installed capacity is 1,064 MW, which makes it one of the world's largest operational onshore wind farms.

By April 2012, its combined installed capacity crossed 1000 MW i.e.,1 GW.  At 1064 MW, the wind park became the largest of its kind in India, and one of the largest wind farms in the world.

In 2015, 24 wind turbine generator of 2.1 MW each were installed at Tejuva, taking the overall production to 1300 MW.

Gallery

See also

Wind power in India
List of largest power stations in the world
List of onshore wind farms

References

Jaisalmer district
Wind farms in Rajasthan
Thar Desert
Buildings and structures in Jaisalmer
2001 establishments in Rajasthan
Energy infrastructure completed in 2001